A BR-377 is an diagonal federal highway in Rio Grande do Sul, Brazil. It connects the city of Carazinho to the border with Uruguay, in the Brazilian city of Quaraí. 

In Alegrete and Quaraí, there is a large production of rice and the creation of sheep. The production of soy and corn, among other crops, is large throughout the state.

References

Federal highways in Brazil